Aliaksandr Kazulka (born December 8, 1983) is a male hammer thrower from Belarus. He set his personal best (78.54 metres) in the men's hammer throw event on July 6, 2006 in Brest, Belarus.

Achievements

References

1983 births
Living people
Belarusian male hammer throwers
Universiade medalists in athletics (track and field)
Universiade silver medalists for Belarus
Medalists at the 2007 Summer Universiade